Black Eyed Bruiser is the second studio album from Australian singer Stevie Wright.  The album was not as commercially successful as its predecessor Hard Road and would be the Wright's final album released with production team Vanda and Young and record label Albert Productions.

Background
After the success of Stevie Wright's debut album Hard Road and its lead single "Evie", producers Harry Vanda and George Young returned to Albert Studios with Wright to record the follow-up album. The recording of the album was problematic as Wright's heroin addition, unbeknown to Vanda and Young, had escalated.  During one session, Wright's manager Michael Chugg saw Wright doing heroin, out of sight of George and Harry who were in the recording booth.  Chugg walked into the booth and told them to, "Come with me, I want you to see this."  He led around to where they could see Stevie sniffing heroin from aluminium foil and said, "There you go, that's your problem, end of story".

Reception
Because Wright was going through drug rehabilitation, he was not able to promote the album.  The album sold less than the more successful Hard Road, although the lead single "Guitar Band" reached No. 13 on the Australian Charts and No. 8 in Melbourne.

The compact disc is currently out-of-print and has become quite rare. A digital edition was available on iTunes as of June 2014.

Track listing
All tracks written by Harry Vanda and George Young except where noted.

Side 1
 "Black Eyed Bruiser"
 "The Loser"
 "You"
 "My Kind of Music"

Side 2
 "Guitar Band"
 "The People And The Power"
 "Help, Help"
 "Twenty Dollar Bill" (Stevie Wright)
 "I've Got The Power" (Stevie Wright)

References

Further reading
 Vanda & Young: Inside Australia's Hit Factory. Tait, John. Sydney: University of New South Wales Press. .
 NOTE: only overview is available for on-line version.
 NOTE: only overview is available for on-line version.

1975 albums
Stevie Wright albums